Whitefish Bay 32A is a First Nations reserve on Lake of the Woods near Sioux Narrows-Nestor Falls in northwestern Ontario. It is the main reserve of the Naotkamegwanning First Nation.

References

Saulteaux reserves in Ontario
Communities in Kenora District